Xitintoday (pronounced as Exit into day) is a studio album released by Nik Turner's Sphynx in 1978. It was produced by Steve Hillage (listed as Stiv Hillage).

In the Winter of 1976-7, after Turner had been dismissed from Hawkwind, he traveled to Egypt and made some portable recordings playing flute in the King's Chamber of Great Pyramid of Giza. He persuaded Tony Stratton-Smith of Charisma Records, who were Hawkwind's record company, to fund his working of these tapes into an album by regaling him with stories of his adventure.

Steve Hillage had joined Gong for their one-off re-union event in Paris on 28 May, then in July travelled to Los Angeles with Miquette Giraudy to work on his funk-tinged Motivation Radio album with Malcolm Cecil at the Record Plant. Hillage took Turner's original tapes with him for some pre-production work at Westlake Audio. In the interim, Turner had performed with Harry Williamson at the 7/7/77 impromptu Glastonbury Festival.

A loose group was assembled to work-up the recordings at Rockfield Studios, joining Turner, Williamson, Hillage and Giraudy were Gong musicians Mike Howlett (bass) and Tim Blake (synthesiser). There was a plethora of drummers and percussionists including Michael Ashmore, Andy Anderson, Alan Powell (conga), Shelley Morris (conga), Morris Pert (vibes, timpani), Jhalib (tabla) and Baron Sanyata (timbales). Jeremy Gilbert contributed harp and Georges Kazazian added rebab, while Turner adapted lyrics from the Egyptian Book of the Dead.

The album was released in April 1978 attributed to Nik Turner's Sphynx, with a cover and 16-page booklet put together by Barney Bubbles incorporating concrete poetry. It has been re-issued several times, the last in 2007 by Eclectic with a bonus track of the original flute recordings. Dave Thompson  described it for AllMusic as a "magical, mysterious, and, most of all, moody album. Songs as such do not exist; rather, lyrics and arrangements follow an atmosphere-licked destiny of their own making, to take the listener deep inside some forgotten pyramid, to witness the spectral rituals being enacted therein."

The group performed live, particularly on the festival circuit with a revolving body of performers that included drummers Steve Broughton and Ermanno Ghisio-Erba, guitarists David O'List and Steffe Sharpstrings (Stephan Lowry), and singer Corrina. Turner organised a Bohemian Love-In event at the Roundhouse on 17 June to promote its release. Other appearances included Glastonbury in June and July, Stonehenge Free Festival, Deeply Vale Festivals on 25 July, and Rock Against Racism Festival at Harwich on 5 August. The group appeared at the Gong Christmas Party on 19 December at Camden Town Electric Ballroom.

With Williamson, Turner conceived the protest single "Nuclear Waste" recorded with Hillage, Howlett and Broughton, and lead vocals from Sting. Williamson had become emotionally involved with Gilli Smyth after her separation from Daevid Allen and the pair embarked on a new project as Mother Gong. Their first album Fairy Tales was effectively by the Sphynx group from the Gong Christmas show, or vice versa. Turner's band would continue into 1979 evolving into Inner City Unit, appearing as both Sphynx and ICU at the Glastonbury and Stonehenge festivals, Turner's activities were reported in the mainstream media in 1979, principally by Jeremy Sandford who was taking an interest in re-incarnation, some filming done by BBC Television for the programme I Have Seen Yesterday by Hugh Burnett.

Track listing 
All tracks composed by Nik Turner, arranged by Sphynx
"The Awakening (Life on Venus)" - 4:20
"The Pyramid Spell" - 4:18
"The Hall of Double Truth" - 6:00
"Anubis" - 4:39
"Thoth" - 3:40
"Horus" - 5:18
"Isis and Nephthys" - 5:46
"Osiris" - 5:10
"God Rock (The Awakening)" - 8:09
"Pyramidaflutenik" - 29:51 (bonus track)

Personnel 
Nik Turner - vocals, flute (1,2,4-8), Moog (3), Chinese bells (3,7), saxophone (9)
Harry Williamson - acoustic guitar (7), piano (1,6), Chinese bells (3,9), zither (5)
Steve Hillage - electric guitars, synthesiser (3,6), Moog bass (5), bells (7), bass (9)
Miquette Giraudy - vocals (7,8), synthesiser (1,3-6), Tibetan and Chinese bells
Mike Howlett - electric bass guitar (2-4,7,8)
Tim Blake - synthesisers (1,3-7), sequencer (5), Moog bass (9)
Malcolm Ashmore - drums (3,7,8)
with
Jeremy Gilbert - harp (7,8)
Georges Kazazian - rebab (2,7)
Alan Powell - conga (5,7-9)
Shelley Morris - conga (9)
Jhalib - tabla (2,6,9)
Morris Pert - percussion (2-4), vibes and timpani (8)
Android Anderson - drums on (9)
Baron Sanyata - timbales (5,9)
Production
Steve Hillage - production
John McAfee - engineering (King's Chamber)
Lyn Peterzel - engineering (Westlake Audio)
Dave Charles - engineering (Rockfield)

References
Footnotes

Citations

See also
 Paul Horn (musician), another musician who recorded music inside the Great Pyramid (1976)

1978 debut albums
Albums produced by Steve Hillage
Charisma Records albums
Albums recorded at Rockfield Studios
Nik Turner albums